Sven Fahlén (born 6 October 1959) is a Swedish biathlete. He competed at the 1980 Winter Olympics and the 1984 Winter Olympics.

References

1959 births
Living people
Swedish male biathletes
Olympic biathletes of Sweden
Biathletes at the 1980 Winter Olympics
Biathletes at the 1984 Winter Olympics
People from Östersund
20th-century Swedish people